Seja Online is a Brazilian e-commerce company that was founded in Belo Horizonte, Minas Gerais, Brazil. It was founded in 2007 for Computer Science students. In 2010 it has passed the mark of 40,000 registered stores and more than 1,500 active e-commerces.

References

Online retailers of Brazil
Web hosting
Companies based in Minas Gerais
Internet properties established in 2007
Mass media companies established in 2007
2007 establishments in Brazil